In cryptography, the simple XOR cipher is a type of additive cipher, an encryption algorithm that operates according to the principles:

A  0 = A,
A  A = 0,
A  B = B  A,
(A  B)  C = A  (B  C),
(B  A)  A = B  0 = B,

For example where  denotes the exclusive disjunction (XOR) operation. This operation is sometimes called modulus 2 addition (or subtraction, which is identical). With this logic, a string of text can be encrypted by applying the bitwise XOR operator to every character using a given key.  To decrypt the output, merely reapplying the XOR function with the key will remove the cipher.

Example
The string "Wiki" ( in 8-bit ASCII) can be encrypted with the repeating key  as follows:

{|
|  || 
|-
|  || 
|-
| = || style="border-top: 1px solid black" | 
|}

And conversely, for decryption:

{|
|  || 
|-
|  || 
|-
| = || style="border-top: 1px solid black" | 
|}

Use and security 
The XOR operator is extremely common as a component in more complex ciphers. By itself, using a constant repeating key, a simple XOR cipher can trivially be broken using frequency analysis. If the content of any message can be guessed or otherwise known then the key can be revealed. Its primary merit is that it is simple to implement, and that the XOR operation is computationally inexpensive. A simple repeating XOR (i.e. using the same key for xor operation on the whole data) cipher is therefore sometimes used for hiding information in cases where no particular security is required. The XOR cipher is often used in computer malware to make reverse engineering more difficult.

If the key is random and is at least as long as the message, the XOR cipher is much more secure than when there is key repetition within a message. When the keystream is generated by a pseudo-random number generator, the result is a stream cipher. With a key that is truly random, the result is a one-time pad, which is unbreakable in theory.

The XOR operator in any of these ciphers is vulnerable to a known-plaintext attack, since plaintext  ciphertext = key.
It is also trivial to flip arbitrary bits in the decrypted plaintext by manipulating the ciphertext.
This is called malleability.

Usefulness in cryptography 
The primary reason XOR is so useful in cryptography is because it is "perfectly balanced"; for a given plaintext input 0 or 1, the ciphertext result is equally likely to be either 0 or 1 for a truly random key bit.

The table below shows all four possible pairs of plaintext and key bits. It is clear that if nothing is known about the key or plaintext, nothing can be determined from the ciphertext alone.

Other logical operations such and AND or OR do not have such a mapping (for example, AND would produce three 0's and one 1, so knowing that a given ciphertext bit is a 0 implies that there is a 2/3 chance that the original plaintext bit was a 0, as opposed to the ideal 1/2 chance in the case of XOR)

Example implementation
Example using the Python programming language.
from os import urandom

def genkey(length: int) -> bytes:
    """Generate key."""
    return urandom(length)

def xor_strings(s, t) -> bytes:
    """Concate xor two strings together."""
    if isinstance(s, str):
        # Text strings contain single characters
        return "".join(chr(ord(a) ^ b) for a, b in zip(s, t)).encode('utf8')
    else:
        # Bytes objects contain integer values in the range 0-255
        return bytes([a ^ b for a, b in zip(s, t)])

message = 'This is a secret message'
print('Message:', message)

key = genkey(len(message))
print('Key:', key)

cipherText = xor_strings(message.encode('utf8'), key)
print('cipherText:', cipherText)
print('decrypted:', xor_strings(cipherText, key).decode('utf8'))

# Verify
if xor_strings(cipherText, key).decode('utf8') == message:
    print('Unit test passed')
else:
    print('Unit test failed')

See also 
 Block cipher
 Vernam cipher
 Vigenère cipher

References

Notes

Citations

Sources

 
 

  Transcript of a lecture given by Prof. Tutte at the University of Waterloo

Stream ciphers